Acrocercops clisiopa is a moth of the family Gracillariidae, known from Taiwan. It was described by Edward Meyrick in 1935. The hostplant for the species is Macaranga tanarius.

References

clisiopa
Moths of Taiwan
Moths described in 1935